The Women's 4 × 5 kilometre relay cross-country skiing competition at the 2006 Winter Olympics in Turin, Italy was held on 18 February, at Pragelato.

Vibeke Skofterud, Hilde Gjermundshaug Pedersen, Kristin Størmer Steira and Marit Bjørgen of Norway were the defending World Champions, but finished third at a pre-Olympic World Cup event in Val di Fiemme, where a team representing Finland won. Germany were defending Olympic champions, with Claudia Künzel, Manuela Henkel, Viola Bauer and Evi Sachenbacher.

Results
Each team used four skiers, with each completing racing over the same 5 kilometre circuit. The first two raced in the classical style, and the final pair of skiers raced freestyle.

The race was started at 09:45.

References

Women's cross-country skiing at the 2006 Winter Olympics
Women's 4 × 5 kilometre relay cross-country skiing at the Winter Olympics